The 1920–21 Kansas Jayhawks men's basketball team represented the University of Kansas during the 1920–21 college men's basketball season.

Roster
Roy Bennett
Waldo Bowman
Paul Endacott
Armin F. Woestemeyer
Clarence Houk
Andrew McDonald
Herbert Olson
George Rody
Adolph Rupp
George Staplin
Ernst Uhrlaub
John Wulf

Schedule and results

References

Kansas Jayhawks men's basketball seasons
Kansas
Kansas Jayhawks Men's Basketball Team
Kansas Jayhawks Men's Basketball Team